Anuradha Pavunraj or P. Anuradha (25 May 1992 - ) is an Indian weightlifter from Pudhukkottai, Tamil Nadu. She represented India in the 2019 Commonwealth Weightlifting Championships in Apia, Samoa. She won the gold medal in the Women's 87 kg category weightlifting with a lift of 221 kg (100 kg in snatch and 121 kg in clean and jerk).

Early life
Anuradha was born on 25 May 1992 in Nemmelipatti in Pudhukkottai, Tamil Nadu. She has an elder brother, Marimuthu. Having lost their father when they were young, her elder brother gave up his studies to help her. He guided her to pursue in Sports instead of becoming an engineering graduate.

She completed her Computer Science graduation from Rajah’s College and Post graduation from JJ College.
She joined as a sub-inspector of Tamil Nadu Police in 2016 in Thanjavur District.

In March 2019, under Government of India's Sai sponsorship she trained at the Indian Camp in Patiala and got selected for Commonwealth Championships, where she won gold.

Major results

References

Living people
1992 births
Indian female weightlifters
Weightlifters from Tamil Nadu
20th-century Indian women
21st-century Indian women